Bhind district is a district in the Chambal division of the Indian state of Madhya Pradesh. The town of Bhind is the district headquarters.
Bhind District is situated in Chambal region in the northwest of the state. It is bounded by Agra, Etawah, Jalaun and Jhansi districts of Uttar Pradesh state to the north and the east, and the Madhya Pradesh districts of Datia to the south, Gwalior to the southwest, and Morena to the west. The geography of the district is characterised by uneven ravines, plain fertile fields and scanty forests.

Bhind's soil is drained by the Chambal, Kali Sind, Kunwari or Kwari, Pahuj and Baisali rivers by an extensive canal system. Formerly there were four tehsils, Bhind, Mehgaon, Gohad and Lahar, but at present there are ten tehsils: Bhind, Ater, Gormi, Mau, Mehgaon, Gohad, Lahar, Mihona, Raun and recently Amayan is the newest tehsil of Bhind. The district is part of the Chambal Division.

History
The district is named after the mythological Hindu saint Vibhandak Rishi, also called Bhindi Rishi. During the Mahabharata war the district was believed to have been ruled by the Chedis, then the Yadus. The Chedis were one of the Mahajanapadas. Then the district was ruled by the Nandas, Mauryas and later Shungas. Soon Shunga rule was replaced with branches of the Nagas with headquarters in Kantipuri and Padmavati. After a brief interregnum by the Kushans, the Nagas re-emerged. Around 270 copper coins from this period were found from the third and fourth centuries CE in Akoda village in Bhind district. By the middle of the fourth century the territory came under Gupta control. Afterwards the territory was controlled by the Vardhanas and in the eighth century, the Rajput-Pratiharas.  In 1195 Mohammed Ghuri attacked the Pratihara chief in Gwalior, who surrendered. For the next three centuries the Delhi Sultanate had control over the district.

In the Mughal period the district fell under the Subedar of Agra. At the latter half of the 17th century a Jat family founded the town of Gohad and captured all the territory around it. He was, however, defeated by the Bhadawar rajputs. In 1736 and 1737, the Marathas defeated the Raja of Bhadawar and forced him to flee from the district. In 1805, the British, under a treaty with Gwalior, gave all the land comprising Bhind to the Scindias of Gwalior. In 1899, the Bhind-Gwalior light rail was built.

The State of Madhya Bharat was formally inaugurated by Jawaharlal Nehru, the then Prime Minister of India, on 28 May 1948 at Gwalior. Scindia and Holkar were sworn in as the Rajpramukh and Up-Rajpramukh, respectively. It was decided to divide the Union into six districts and Bhind was one among them. As a result of reorganisation of the states Madhya Bharat was added to Madhya Pradesh state on 1 November 1956.

Mythology and history 

 Ganesh Mandir is an ancient Ganesh temple built at the ghats of Gauri pond.
 Dandraua Hanuman Mandir (Mau) is an ancient Hanuman Mandir. Hanuman ji is best known as Dr. Hanuman.
 Vankhandeshwar Mandir is an ancient Shivalaya built by Prithviraj Chauhan.
 Akoda is the place where Kherapati Hanuman Mandir (Panjay Sarkar).
 Naarada (Lahar) is the place where mythological saint Maharshi Narada prayed.
 Pandari is a village in Bhind Tehsil, where Pandavas took refuge during Agyatvas period of their banishment. Pandari is originated from the word Pandav Vati.
 Bhawani Gauri Sarover is a pond built at Bhind town by Prithvi Raj Chauhan.
 Machhand is a village in Mihona Tehsil, noted as the place of penance of Machhendranath, the Guru of Guru Gorakhnath.
 Bijpuri is a village in Bhind Tehsil, known for the Samadhi of Sage Gwalav, after which Gopachal fort came to be known as Gwalior Fort.
 Boreshwar is a temple in Ater Tehsil at Dulhagan village and contains an ancient Shiva temple.

Ravines
This region is known for its extensive ravines. The ravines created by gully erosion are heavily under soil loss. The Government of Madhya Pradesh has tried to check this soil erosion and expansion of ravines by the means of watershed development and by aerial-seeding for plants like Prosopis, Acacia, and Jatropha in the ravines.

Demographics

According to the 2011 census Bhind District had a population of 1,703,005, roughly equal to the nation of The Gambia or the US state of Nebraska. This gives it a ranking of 286th in India (out of a total of 640). Its population growth rate over the decade 2001-2011 was 19.25%. Bhind has a sex ratio of 837 females for every 1000 males, and a literacy rate of 64.29%. 25.42% of the population lives in urban areas. Scheduled Castes and Scheduled Tribes make up 22.01% and 0.36% of the population respectively. Hindi is the predominant language, spoken by 99.59% of the population.

The dominant castes of Bhind are Rajput, Brahmin, Yadav, Soni, Baghel, Kayastha, Gurjar and Jain with sizeable number of Lodhis and Yadavs.

Administration
Sandhya Ray is the MP from Bhind Lok Sabha constituency, elected in the 2019 Indian general election as a member of the Bharatiya Janata Party.

Tourist attractions

Chhatri of Malhar Rao Holkar, Alampur 
Maharani Ahilyabai Holkar built the chhatri of Malhar Rao Holkar at Alampur in Bhind district in 1766. It is marked by carvings. It is built on the pattern of the chhatris of Holkar rulers at Indore.

Shri Rawatpura Dham 
The temple of Hindu Lord Hanuman is situated at Lahar tehsil of Bhind. This place is known as Rawatpura Dham and is under in Lahar tehsil.

Fort of Ater 
Ater Fort was built by king Badan Singh Bhadauria from 1664 to 1668.

Jain temples 
The temple of Lord Mahavira is situated at Barason in Mehgaon tehsil. In Jain tradition, it is among the Atishaya kshetra, i.e. places where Lord Mahavira visited during his journey after getting Kaivalya (Ultimate Realization) and miraculous events took place. There are approximately 60 Jain temples in Bhind town itself.

Mata Renuka Temple 
An ancient temple is situated at Jamdara village in Mau tehsil,  from Bhind, which was thought to be built by the mythological sage Parashurama.

Narad Dev Temple 
An ancient temple of God Narad Dev is situated on the banks of the Kali Sindh.

National Chambal (Gharial) Wildlife Sanctuary 
National Chambal (Gharial) Wildlife Sanctuary is situated on the Chambal River, and is inhabited by crocodiles, ghariyals, Ganges dolphins, and migratory birds. A boat cruise is organised by local forest officials.

Gohad Fort 
Gohad Fort was built by the Bamraulia Jat ruler Singhandev II in 1505. Government offices are currently situated on its premises.

Sun Temple 

Ancient Dandraua Temple Mau Tehsil
This is a temple to the Hindu God Hanuman, believed to possess curing powers. Worshipers go to the temple every Tuesday and Saturday. Another Panchmukhi Hanuman mandir in Heerapura  from Lahar. Dandraua Dham [website] Dr. Hanuman | Dandraua sarkar | Dandraua Dham and in Rohani jagir village,  from lahar tehsil; you can see about 70- to 80-year-old banyan tree which is very huge and under which is the temple of Lord Shiva is also built, which is known as asana and there is also a waterfall next to the temple.

Vankhandeshwar Temple
Vankhandeshwar temple of Lord Shiva is located near the bank of Gauri Sarovar, a beautiful lake. It is said that this temple is founded by Prithviraj chauhan (Prithviraj).

Malanpur 
Malanpur is the modern industrial area in Bhind District near Gwalior in Gohad tehsil,  from Bhind town. Its industries include modern automobiles, bicycles, soaps and detergents, electronics, pharmaceuticals and food and dairy products

Here is a nagar panchayat having population approximately 20,000. This is a historical place. Bhadauriya Rajput (Rao sahab) ruled here and had their kings here.

Main attractions are old garhi and Hanuman mandir.

Villages
 

Makhori

References

External links

Bhind District

 
Districts of Madhya Pradesh